The Acciona Open de España (formerly the Spanish Open) is the national open golf championship of Spain. It was founded in 1912 and has been part of the European Tour's schedule since the inception of the Tour in 1972. Except for a five-year period in the early 1980s, the tournament has been played in April or May. In 2005, it was one of five European Tour events to be held in Spain. Former champions include Arnold Palmer, Seve Ballesteros, Bernhard Langer, Nick Faldo and Jon Rahm.

Winners

Multiple winners
Thirteen men have won the tournament more than once through 2022.

5 wins
Ángel de la Torre: 1916, 1917, 1919, 1923, 1925
4 wins
Mariano Provencio: 1934, 1941, 1943, 1951
Gabriel Gonzalez: 1932, 1933, 1940, 1942
3 wins
Arnaud Massy: 1912, 1927, 1928
Joaquin Bernardino: 1926, 1930, 1934
Marcelino Morcillo: 1946, 1948, 1949
Max Faulkner: 1952, 1953, 1957
Sebastián Miguel: 1954, 1960, 1967
Seve Ballesteros: 1981, 1985, 1995
Jon Rahm : 2018, 2019, 2022
2 wins
Eugène Lafitte: 1921, 1929
Peter Alliss: 1956, 1958
Ángel Miguel: 1961, 1964
Dale Hayes: 1971, 1979
Eddie Polland: 1976, 1980
Bernhard Langer: 1984, 1989
Mark James: 1988, 1997

References

External links

Coverage on the European Tour's official site

European Tour events
Golf tournaments in Spain
Recurring sporting events established in 1912
1912 establishments in Spain